"Seventeen Going Under" is a song by English singer-songwriter Sam Fender. It was released on 7 July 2021 as the lead single from his second studio album of the same name. The song was written by Fender, and produced by Bramwell Bronte. It was a sleeper hit, peaking at number three on the UK Singles Chart on 7 January 2022, becoming Fender's highest-charting career single to date.

"Seventeen Going Under" was named Hottest Record of the Year 2021 by BBC Radio 1 listeners and was voted number sixteen by Australian radio Triple J listeners on the Triple J Hottest 100 chart. It was also voted number one by more than 14,000 Radio X listeners for the Best of British 2022. In May 2022, the song won the Ivor Novello Award for Best Song Musically and Lyrically from the British Academy of Songwriters, Composers, and Authors. It received the 2022 Rolling Stone UK Award for Song of the Year Award.

Background and release
The song chronicles Fender's life at 17 when his mother, Shirley was afflicted with fibromyalgia and depressed because she could no longer work after 40 years of service as a nurse. She had become the owner of her apartment at 19 and had never missed a workday. Nevertheless, the Department for Work and Pensions began harassing her with letters and treating her unjustly. Fender was trying to help his mother financially but could not due to his young age. Fender recalled: "That's when my rose-tinted glasses fell off." He told Rolling Stone that it is "a letter to [his] 17 year old self", explaining: "17 is when all the challenges begin: you're not a baby, but you're definitely not an adult, I'm not even sure it'll happen at all for you, but growing up is for fools and the near dead, so stop being so serious all the time".

On 7 July 2021, Fender shared the song and announced it would be the title song from his forthcoming album. It also went viral on TikTok, with users utilising the song to "convey their personal tales of abuse and mistreatment". About the phenomenon, Fender stated to Radio X: "I'm honoured that Seventeen's kind of resonated with people in that way. It's a very special moment for me as a songwriter".

Critical reception
Rolling Stone called the song a "five minutes of glorious, life-affirming rock and roll". Retro Gazing commented that the song "feels nostalgic and melancholic", and stated It's "a song that so many people can relate to, regardless of what age they're in, though possibly especially for those who have finally had the chance to clearly see their youth in a new, possibly more realistic and understanding, light". Georgie Holland and Scott Colothan of Absolute Radio described "Seventeen Going Under" as an "emphatic, soaring guitar song that collates the struggles of unemployed life, but also the daftness of age where you otherwise have little to fear and the world at your feet." In Tribune magazine, Alex Niven called the song "a triumphant memento vivere for dark times" and commended Fender for "produc[ing] a towering monument to a decade of social injustice and building youthful radicalism which the political mainstream seems determined to try to whitewash."

Rankings

Track listing

Credits and personnel
Credits adapted from AllMusic.

 Alex Borwick – assistant engineer
 Joe Atkinson – synthesizer
 Bramwell Bronte – producer
 Mark Broughton – engineer
 Greg Calbi – mastering engineer
 Johnny Davis – saxophone
 Steve Fallone – mastering engineer
 Sam Fender – composer, glockenspiel, guitar, guitar (acoustic), piano, primary artist, vocals, vocals (background)
 Thom Lewis – percussion, programming
 Drew Michael – drums
 Craig Silvey – mixing
 Dani Spragg – engineer
 Dean Thompson – engineer, guitar
 Tom Ungerer – engineer

Charts

Weekly charts

Year-end charts

Certifications

Release history

References

2021 singles
2021 songs
Sam Fender songs
Polydor Records singles